Deron Leigh Cherry (born September 12, 1959) is an American former professional football player who was a free safety for the Kansas City Chiefs in the National Football League (NFL) from 1981 to 1991. Cherry was a free safety and punter at Rutgers University, intercepting a total of 9 passes over his three seasons, which he returned for 126 yards and two touchdowns. In 1979, he was named the team's MVP. In 1979 and 1980, Cherry earned AP All-East honors. In 1981, he was signed by the Kansas City Chiefs as a free agent  but was released in the final teams cuts. Cherry rejoined the club as a safety, and made his first career interception against the Oakland Raiders.

Cherry played high school football at Palmyra High School in Palmyra, New Jersey.

Regarded as one of the best free safeties to have ever played the game, he was a six-time Pro Bowl selection from 1983 to 1988, starting in five of them in his 11 years with the Chiefs. Few other Chiefs players have been selected to this number of Pro Bowls. He had six 100 tackle seasons in his 11 years as a member of the Chiefs, with a career total of 927 tackles. He was a 5-time All-Pro in 1983, 1984, 1985, 1986, and 1988. He was also a five-time 1st team All-AFC and two time 2nd team All-AFC selection. Cherry's 15 career fumble recoveries place him in a three-way tie for the Chiefs record. He ranks third on the Chiefs list of most interceptions, and is only the 26th player in the history of the NFL to reach the 50 interception plateau. In 1987, he was selected to the Chiefs 25 year All-Time Team.

In 1987, he won the Byron "Whizzer" White NFL Man of the Year Award. Prior to receiving this award, he was the Chiefs NFL Man of the Year selection in 1987. This is the most prestigious award given by the NFL Players Association.

He is actively involved in several civic organizations, including Special Olympics, Muscular Dystrophy Association, Project Warmth, Score 1 for Health, Camp Quality USA, and the United Negro College Fund. For the past 25 years, Cherry has hosted his Celebrity Invitational. This tournament has raised over $3 million to support the children of the Kansas City area. Cherry is a frequent guest speaker at civic, charitable, and corporate events throughout the country.

In 1995, Cherry became a limited ownership partner in one of the NFL's then-new expansion teams, the Jacksonville Jaguars. This made him the first minority owner of an NFL franchise in the league's history.  Cherry is also a managing general partner with United Beverage, a local Anheuser-Busch distributor.

In 2019, the Professional Football Researchers Association named Cherry to the PFRA Hall of Very Good Class of 2019

References

1959 births
Living people
People from Riverside Township, New Jersey
American football safeties
Rutgers Scarlet Knights football players
Kansas City Chiefs players
American Conference Pro Bowl players
Jacksonville Jaguars announcers
Ed Block Courage Award recipients